Bridgar is an unincorporated place in Manitoba, Canada. It is serviced by the Bridgar railway station of the Winnipeg–Churchill train.

References

Unincorporated communities in Northern Region, Manitoba